Silver is an unincorporated community in northwestern Coke County, Texas, United States.  Its elevation is 2,100 feet (640 m).  Although Silver is unincorporated, it has a post office, with the ZIP code of 76949; the ZCTA for ZIP code 76949 had a population of 30 at the 2000 census.  Founded in 1890, the post office was temporarily closed from 1907 to 1908.

Founded in the 1870s, Silver was long a center of ranching.  However, the discovery of oil shortly after the end of World War II caused the community's population to boom, although the community has since declined.

Silver was home to several camps of oil-company employees in the 1950s and 1960s. It had an independent school district, which provided housing for teachers, offering education to the eighth grade. The town also had three churches, Baptist, Methodist and Church of Christ, a gasoline station, and a grocery store.

The oil companies moved their employees out in 1966. The school district then consolidated with Robert Lee ISD and closed the local school. Most of the houses in town were moved to other places, leaving the settlement sparsely populated.

References

External links
Profile of Silver from the Handbook of Texas Online

Unincorporated communities in Coke County, Texas
Unincorporated communities in Texas